West Lancaster Township is a township in 
Keokuk County, Iowa.

References

Townships in Keokuk County, Iowa
Townships in Iowa